Gersson Rosas (born June 11, 1978) is a basketball executive who is a Senior Basketball Advisor of the New York Knicks. Rosas was also the president of basketball operations of the Minnesota Timberwolves of the National Basketball Association (NBA). He was previously the  Executive Vice President of Basketball Operations for the Houston Rockets, where he worked for 16 seasons, and served under Daryl Morey. Rosas was briefly GM of the Dallas Mavericks. He has also worked for Team USA Basketball as an international scout since 2015.

Early career
Born in Colombia, Rosas immigrated to the U.S. with his family when he was three years old.
He attended the University of Houston from 1996 to 2000, graduating with a degree in sports and business management.

Management career

Houston Rockets
Rosas joined the Houston Rockets front office in 2003. He began working under legendary Houston GM Carroll Dawson and stayed on after Dawson's retirement, to become a trusted confidant of then GM Daryl Morey. During his career with the Rockets, Rosas served various roles, beginning as a Personnel Scout/Video Coordinator for three seasons, and ultimately worked his way up to Executive Vice President of Basketball Operations, where he worked closely with Morey. Secondarily, he served as Director of Player Personnel, Director of Scouting, and General Manager for Houston's D-League affiliate, the Rio Grande Valley Vipers. The Vipers made the D-League finals in all four of Rosas' seasons as GM, winning the D-League Championship twice.

During Rosas’s tenure in Houston the Rockets made the playoffs 12 times, advancing to the Western Conference Finals in 2015 and 2018. In 2017-18, the Rockets were owners of the NBA’s best record (65-17), top offense in the league and a dynamic style of defense. Rosas played significant roles in developing the team’s philosophy and roster, including the successful pursuits of Most Valuable Player James Harden and All-Star Chris Paul via trade acquisitions along with the free agent recruitment of P.J. Tucker and Eric Gordon. In addition, he was a leading force in the past draft selections of Clint Capela and Montrezl Harrell; trade acquisitions of Kyle Lowry, Goran Dragic and Luis Scola, and past free agent acquisitions of Dwight Howard and Patrick Beverley. Rosas also played a key role in head coach and coaching staff hires in the NBA (Mike D’Antoni, Kevin McHale) and NBA G League (Chris Finch, Nick Nurse).

Dallas Mavericks
Rosas was the Dallas Mavericks general manager in 2013, but left the post after only 3 months due to disagreements with management and returned to Houston. Rosas served as the general manager of the Dallas Mavericks in the summer of 2013, becoming the first Latino GM in the history of the NBA, before returning to Houston. Rosas takes great pride in his Latino heritage and has made it a personal mission to create more opportunities for Latinos to follow in his footsteps. Rosas received the La Familia Latino Heritage Award for his role in promoting, supporting, and contributing to the Latino community in Minnesota and throughout the nation.

Minnesota Timberwolves
After six more seasons in Houston, Rosas was hired by the Minnesota Timberwolves as their president of basketball operations on May 1, 2019.

Gersson Rosas completed his second season as President of Basketball Operations after being hired by the Timberwolves on May 3, 2019. Rosas was responsible for all decisions within the Timberwolves basketball department.

Rosas negotiated numerous player transactions in the summer of 2019, upgrading the team’s overall talent and depth. In the 2019 NBA Draft, he traded up to get the No. 6 pick and selected guard Jarrett Culver, and drafted guard Jaylen Nowell from Washington in the second round. Rosas traded for forward Jake Layman and signed undrafted free agent center Naz Reid. In February of 2020, the organization acquired All-Star guard D’Angelo Russell, guard Malik Beasley, forward Juancho Hernangomez and forward Jarred Vanderbilt. He followed those acquisitions up by making a splash in the 2020 NBA Draft that saw the Timberwolves select Anthony Edwards with the first overall pick in the draft and trade for Jaden McDaniels and the recently named Spanish ACB League Most Spectacular Player Leandro Bolmaro, while additionally acquiring Ricky Rubio from the Oklahoma City Thunder.

During the 2020-21 NBA season, Rosas hired Chris Finch as the 16th Head Coach in team history. Following the All-Star break, the Timberwolves doubled their win total and saw improvements throughout the roster including performance and metrics from Karl-Anthony Towns, Russell and Edwards. 

He was relieved of his duties on September 22, 2021.

New York Knicks
Rosas was hired by the New York Knicks as a Senior Basketball Advisor in February of 2022.

References

External links
 Sloan Conference Profile

1978 births
Living people
Minnesota Timberwolves executives
People from Bogotá
University of Houston alumni
Date of birth missing (living people)
Houston Rockets executives
Dallas Mavericks personnel
National Basketball Association general managers